is an athletic stadium in Kōriyama, Fukushima, Japan.

External links
  

Football venues in Japan
Sports venues in Fukushima Prefecture
Kōriyama